The Hon Tre bent-toed gecko (Cyrtodactylus hontreensis)  is a species of gecko that is endemic to Hon Tre Island in Vietnam.

References 

Cyrtodactylus
Reptiles described in 2008